Usman Haque (born 1971) is an architect and artist who works with technology. He is known for designing large scale interactive installations and his contributions to Interactive architecture and the Internet of things.

Haque's interactive art has appeared at the Singapore Biennale (2006), London Fashion Week (2007) and has been exhibited at KUNSTEN Museum of Modern Art Aalborg, NTT InterCommunication Center, New York's Museum of Modern Art and Barbican Centre.

According to author Owen Hatherley, Haque’s work “defies conventional classification” and “is not what you would immediately think of as architecture”, often overlapping both digital art and interactive architecture.

Haque’s contribution to interactive architecture is to distinguish between ‘circular mutual reaction’ and ‘linear causal response’ in designing architectural structures and environments, building on Gordon Pask’s cybernetics theories in creating interactive spaces.

Education
Haque studied architecture at the Bartlett School of Architecture and was part of the Bartlett Interactive Architecture Workshop.

Selected projects
 Sky Ear, “a cloud of 1,000 helium balloons launched into the evening sky with a payload of mobile phones, sensor circuits and flashing LEDs”
 Open Burble, “an interactive structure that floated up 18 story’s(sic) high”
 Haunt, “a scientifically haunted room” 
 Evoke, “a riot of projected colours...on the imposing 60 metre-high front of York Minster” 
 Reconfigurable House, “an environment constructed from thousands of low tech components that can be “rewired” by visitors”
 Natural Fuse, “a city-wide network of electronically-assisted plants”

Others include Another Life, one of Haque’s permanent interactive installations, located in Bradford, UK; Assemblance, which “lets visitors sculpt and shapes beams of lasers” [sic]; Cinder, an “augmented reality creature [that] ‘lives in the school’”; and Starling Crossing, an “interactive road crossing that only appears when needed”.

In the internet of things he is known for founding Pachube in 2007, an IoT data platform that “enabled hundreds of Japanese civilians to quickly and easily share weather and radiation data in the aftermath of the Fukushima disaster”, acquired by LogMeIn in 2011, renamed Xively and sold on to Google in 2018. He also founded Thingful, a search engine for the internet of things, in 2013.

Awards and honors
Haque won a Japan Media Arts Festival Excellence Award in 2004 and was a Brit Insurance Design Awards winner in 2008. He was appointed a Design Council Ambassador in 2021 and in 2022 he joined the London Mayor's Data for London Advisory Board.

Further reading
 What is Interaction - Are there different types? Interactions - January/February 2009, by Hugh Dubberly, Paul Pangaro and Usman Haque
 Urban computing in the wild: A survey on large scale participation and citizen engagement with ubiquitous computing, cyber physical systems, and Internet of Things by Flora Salim and Usman Haque
 Interview with Usman Haque in Programming Interactivity
 Designing Projects That Thrill And Empower: The Architect Who Taught A City To Fly

References 

Architects
1971 births

Living people